Ichinomiya (literally first shrine) is historically the supreme shrine in each of the old provinces of Japan, and currently the name of several places in Japan:
a city:
Ichinomiya, Aichi (Japanese: 一宮市; Ichinomiya-shi) containing the shrine of the old province Owari
Owari-Ichinomiya Station along the JR Central Tōkaidō Main Line
Meitetsu Ichinomiya Station along the adjacent Meitetsu Main Line
several towns  (Japanese: 一宮町; Ichinomiya-cho or Ichinomiya-machi):
Ichinomiya, Chiba containing the shrine of the old province Kazusa
Kazusa-Ichinomiya Station, along the JR East Sotobō Line
Ichinomiya, Aichi (Mikawa) containing the shrine of the old province Mikawa
Mikawa-Ichinomiya Station, along the JR Central Iida Line
Ichinomiya, Hyōgo (Shisō) containing the shrine of the old province Harima
Ichinomiya, Hyōgo (Tsuna) containing the shrine of the old province Awaji
Ichinomiya, Kumamoto containing the shrine of the old province Higo
Ichinomiya, Yamanashi containing the shrine of the old province Kai
Ichinomiya Castle in Tosa Province, today's Kōchi Prefecture.